Suzie Miller is an Australian/British playwright, librettist and screenwriter. In April 2022, Miller made her West End debut with Prima Facie starring Jodie Comer.

Overview

Miller is a contemporary international playwright, librettist and screenwriter drawn to complex human stories often exploring injustice. She has often been described as a courageous writer and won the Kit Denton Fellowship for writing with courage in 2008.

Born in Melbourne, she now resides between London and Sydney. Miller's works have been produced around the world, winning several awards. Her play Prima Facie (premiered 2019, Griffin Theatre) won the 2020 Australian Writers' Guild's Major AWGIE Award and the 2020 David Williamson Award for Outstanding Theatre Writing. Its premiere production earned 5-star reviews across all platforms.

Miller studied immunology and microbiology at Monash University, then turned to law at the University of New South Wales and worked as a human rights lawyer and a children's rights advocate. In 2009, she declined an invitation to a magistrate position, left the law, and moved to London in 2010 with her young family to pursue a theatre writing career full-time.

Miller works in theatre, film and television. She is married to Robert Beech-Jones and has two children.

Background 
Her work ranges from large scale to intimate plays (Griffin Theatre, Sydney Theatre Company, Malthouse Theatre Company), to films of original screenplays to television work (Film Art Media; Matchbox/NBC).

Miller has enjoyed many residencies throughout her career; in recent times these have included; University of Queensland (Creative Fellow 2018), Currency Press (2018 and 2019), National Theatre of Scotland (2014), National Theatre in London (2011 and 2009), Griffin Theatre Sydney (2012), Critical Stages NSW (2013), Theatre Gargantua Toronto (2013), and was the artist-in-residence at La Boite Theatre (2016 and 2015). She was attached to Ex Machina in Quebec with Robert Lepage (2012) and has been commissioned by companies in Australia, England, Scotland, Ireland and Canada.

In 2006 and 2009 she was mentored by US playwright Edward Albee.

Works

Early works (2005–2008) 
Miller's first play, Cross Sections, was based on contemporary stories from the experience of working as lawyer for homeless youth in Sydney's red-light district (Kings Cross). It premiered at the Old Fitz Theatre before transferring to the Sydney Opera House. A radio version of the play was recorded at ABC Radio and won the Australian Writers' Guild Award for radio.

Her two follow-up plays SOLD (a darkly humorous play about selling our souls for materialism) and All the Blood and All the Water (tackling racism in Australia), both directed by John Sheedy, won the Inscription award and a mentorship with Edward Albee. SOLD was later produced at Theatre503 in London (2011) directed by Natalie Ibu.

An early work, Reasonable Doubt, played at the Edinburgh and New York Fringe Festivals at the Assembly Rooms (Edinburgh) and the Cherry Lane Theatre, New York, in 2008. Directed by Lee Lewis, it won the New York Fringe Overall Excellence Award for Outstanding Playwriting.

Recent works (2009–present) 
 Transparency premiered at The Old Museum Theatre with Ransom Theatre Company in Belfast in 2009 before touring Northern Ireland.
 Driving Into Walls premiered at the Perth International Arts Centre at the State Theatre Studio Theatre in 2012. It toured Australia, including the Sydney Opera House.
 In the Heart of Derby Park had its premiere season in Glasgow, Scotland with Oran M'or Theatre Company in 2013.
 Onefivezeroseven premiered at the Perth International Arts Centre at the State Theatre Studio Theatre in 2014.
 Caress/Ache premiered in 2016 at Griffin Theatre, Sydney, and had other productions in New Zealand.
 Sunset Strip premiered in 2016 at Griffin Theatre then toured Australia with Critical Stages.
 Snow White – The Opera, directed by Lindy Hume, had its premiere season at the Brisbane International Arts Festival in 2016.
 The Sacrifice Zone premiered in Toronto with Theatre Gargantua in 2016.
 Velvet Evening Séance was developed by National Theatre of Scotland, Cove Park Artists Residency and Arts Scotland for a premiere season at the 2017 Edinburgh Festival Fringe and then Lemon Tree Theatre.
 Medea – A Feminist Retelling premiered at the La Boite Theatre in 2017.
 Dust premiered with the Black Swan State Theatre in Perth, Western Australia, at the Heath Ledger Theatre in 2017. It won the Western Australian biannual Premier's Award for Literature.
 The Mathematics of Longing premiered in 2018 at the La Boite Theatre, Brisbane, Queensland.
 Prima Facie premiered in 2019 at the Stables Theatre, Sydney, directed by Lee Lewis; it has been staged at the West End in London and is scheduled for April 2022 on Broadway; it has been translated into several languages.
 Anna K premiered at Melbourne's Malthouse Theatre in August 2022.
 RBG: Of Many, One, a one-woman play about Ruth Bader Ginsburg, premiered in 2022 at the Wharf 1 Theatre for the Sydney Theatre Company.

Short plays 
 Births, Deaths & Marriages – Sydney, Australia
 Flight/Fright Mode – Sydney, Australia; London, UK; Edinburgh Festival
 Confused Sea Conditions – Walking Fish Theatre, Philadelphia
 I Wrap My Arms Around You – Sydney
 Dreaming of a Kiss on a Pier – Sydney
 Extracurricular – Sydney
 The Emotional Anatomy of a Relationship Breakdown – Melbourne
 Eucalyptus – Bush Theatre, London

Awards 

Miller has won or been shortlisted for a number of Australian Writers' Guild Awards and Premier's awards (Queensland, Western Australia and New South Wales).

She received the 2005 Theatrelab Award and won the 2006 and the 2009 Inscription Award. She received the 2008 National Kit Denton Fellowship for writing with courage, and the 2008 New York Fringe Festival Overall Excellence Award for Outstanding Playwriting.

She was shortlisted for the Griffin Award 2009 and for the 2010 Australian Writers' Guild Award for drama.

Miller has sat on the board of Playworks, Playwriting Australia, TRS, State of Play, Darlinghurst Theatre and the Australian Writers' Guild Theatre. She has been a judge for the Australian Writers' Guild for film scripts, plays and the Kit Denton Fellowship, and has sat on the Australia Council for the Arts literature board as a theatre peer. She is also on the reader panel for various theatre companies in Australia and London.

References

Further reading
 Harrison, Ellie "Prima Facie playwright Suzie Miller: 'We should be able to go out, get drunk, party and walk home without being afraid' ", The Independent, 29 April 2022
 Tiley, David. "From playwright to screenwriter, Suzie Miller reflects on her journey", Screenhub, 18 December 2020
 Trezise, Bryoni. "In Suzie Miller's Prima Facie, theatre finds a voice of reckoning on sexual assault and the law", The Conversation, 28 May 2019

External links
 

Australian dramatists and playwrights
Living people
Year of birth missing (living people)
Lawyers from Melbourne
Monash University alumni
University of New South Wales Law School alumni
Writers from Melbourne
Australian opera librettists